The Row River is a river, approximately  long, in Lane County, Oregon, United States. It rises in the Cascade Range and flows into the Coast Fork Willamette River near Cottage Grove. The stream was originally known as the "East Fork Coast Fork", but was later renamed after a dispute (row) between neighbors and brothers-in-law George Clark and Joseph Southwell over "trespassing" livestock. Clark was killed as a result of the row. The name rhymes with "cow" rather than with "slow".

Course
The river flows predominately westward.

A quarter-mile (500 m) later it passes through Lasells D. Stewart Park, and  later through the community of Culp Creek, where it receives Sharps Creek and then Culp Creek, both from the left bank. Turning northwards, the river receives Hawley Creek from the left just above river mile (RM) 15 or river kilometer (RK 24) and shortly thereafter flows through Dorena. At RM 14 (RK 23), Cedar Creek enters from the right. Soon the river turns sharply west, passes a United States Geological Survey (USGS) stream gauge at RM 13.2 (RK 21.2), and turns to the northwest. Over the next stretch, it receives Pitcher Creek, King Creek, and Anderson Creek, all from the left, before entering Dorena Lake at RM 11 (RK 18).

While part of the lake, the Row River receives Vaughn Creek from the left, Smith Creek from the right, Bluff Creek from the left, Rat Creek from the right, and Baker Creek from the left before reaching Dorena Dam and spillway at about RM 7.5 (RK 12.1). The river passes a second USGS stream gauge  from the mouth, and soon Hann's Creek enters from the right. In its final , the river receives Mosby Creek from the left, turns northwest, flows by Cottage Grove State Airport, and passes under Interstate 5 before entering the Coast Fork Willamette River just below the larger stream's RM 21 (RK 34).

Discharge
The USGS monitors the flow of the Row River at two gauges, one near Dorena,  from the mouth and the other above Cottage Grove,  from the mouth.

See also
 List of rivers of Oregon

References

External links

Coast Fork Willamette Watershed Council

Rivers of Oregon
Rivers of Lane County, Oregon